Riverton was a census-designated place (CDP) in King County, Washington, United States. The population was 6,407 at the 2010 census. Riverton was formerly part of the Riverton-Boulevard Park CDP, which was split up for the 2010 census into Riverton and Boulevard Park. In April 2010 the community was annexed by the city of Burien and is no longer a CDP.

Riverton also refers to a neighboring former community in part of what is now Tukwila in the Duwamish River Valley. It was on the left bank of the Duwamish, not far from the location on the right bank of the present-day Tukwila Community Center.

History
Riverton lent its name to an early 20th-century bridge, variously known as the Riverton Draw Bridge, the Riverton Drawspan, and King County Bridge 622-A. Built 1903, the bridge developed a reputation for being rather unsafe. It closed to vehicles 1919, and was demolished 1927. A remnant of the central pier can still be seen in the river as of 2009, visible either from the riverbank or from the 119th St. S. pedestrian bridge or the Allentown Bridge.

Geography
Riverton is located at  (47.494614, -122.311248).

References

Burien, Washington
History of King County, Washington
Census-designated places in King County, Washington